Earl Wilson Jr. (born October 28, 1987) is a former American football defensive end. He was drafted by the Seattle Seahawks in the fourth round of the 2010 NFL Draft. He played college football at North Carolina.

Professional career

Seattle Seahawks
Wilson was selected in the fourth round of the 2010 NFL Draft by the Seattle Seahawks. He was signed to a four-year contract on June 17, 2010. He was cut on November 23, 2010 after posting one tackle in two games.

Tampa Bay Buccaneers
Wilson signed with the Tampa Bay Buccaneers for the 2011 NFL Training Camp. During the second preseason game, Wilson was injured after rupturing his Achilles tendon. He was ruled out for the season and was placed on Injured Reserve for the 2011 NFL Season.

References

External links
Tampa Bay Buccaneers bio
North Carolina Tar Heels bio

1987 births
Living people
American football defensive ends
North Carolina Tar Heels football players
People from Emporia, Virginia
Players of American football from Virginia
Seattle Seahawks players
Tampa Bay Buccaneers players